The Museum of Partisan Glory is an underground museum in Ukraine. It was established in 1969 in the village of Nerubayske in Odessa region. It was built in an abandoned mine that was used in the construction of Odessa. The catacombs are located at a depth of 12–14 meters. During the Great Patriotic War the catacombs in the village hosted one of the largest guerrilla units in the region. For several centuries coquina was quarried here for the construction of Odessa.

History 

The Museum is a monument of the partisan movement in the Odessa region and, in particular, the soldiers of the detachment of the Hero of the Soviet Union Vladimir Molodtsova-Badaeva. Within six months, a 70-person detachment was active in sabotage and intelligence work. Most of them died. Badaevtsev camp is located two kilometers from the main entrance to the catacombs that were flooded by groundwater. However, enthusiasts club researched archival documents and eyewitnesses and restored its original appearance.

References

External links 

Museums in Odesa Oblast
Military and war museums in Ukraine